The Military ranks of Panama are the ranks used by the Panamanian Public Forces, which have some warfare capabilities. Panama abolished its army in 1990, which was confirmed by an unanimous parliamentary vote for constitutional change in 1994.

Current paramilitary ranks

Commissioned officer ranks
The rank insignia for commissioned officers.

Other ranks
The rank insignia for non-commissioned officers enlisted personnel.

Historic ranks
Between 1968 and 1989, the Panama Defense Forces used these military ranks.

Commissioned officer ranks
The rank insignia for Commissioned officers.

Other ranks
The rank insignia for Non-commissioned officers and enlisted personnel.

References

External links
 
 

Panama
Military of Panama